John Warner (died 1565) was an English academic, cleric, and physician. He was the first Regius Professor of Physic at the University of Oxford, as well as the Vice-Chancellor of the University of Oxford and the Dean of Winchester.

Warner was born in Great Stanmore, Middlesex, England, and studied at the University of Oxford, receiving a Bachelor of Arts in 1520, a Master of Arts in 1525, a Bachelor of Medicine in 1529, and a Doctor of Medicine in 1535. Following his BA, he was elected fellow of All Souls College, Oxford, and on 26 May 1536 was elected Warden of All Souls College. Henry VIII appointed him as the inaugural Regius Professor of Physic in 1540. He retired in 1554 from this professorship, and became Vice-Chancellor of the university. He became a fellow of the College of Physicians on 17 October 1561.

Warner was also ordained and served in various parishes as rector, prebend, Archdeacon of Cleveland, canon, and royal chaplain, and was nominated as Dean of Winchester on 15 October 1559.

References

Year of birth unknown
1565 deaths
People from Stanmore
Alumni of the University of Oxford
Archdeacons of Cleveland
Deans of Winchester
Fellows of All Souls College, Oxford
Fellows of the Royal College of Physicians
Vice-Chancellors of the University of Oxford
Wardens of All Souls College, Oxford
16th-century scholars
16th-century English medical doctors
Regius Professors of Medicine (University of Oxford)